Emily Jordan Osment (born March 10, 1992) is an American actress, singer and songwriter. Born and raised in Los Angeles, Osment began her career as a child actress, appearing in numerous television shows and films, before co-starring as Gerti Giggles in Spy Kids 2: The Island of Lost Dreams (2002) and Spy Kids 3-D: Game Over (2003). She played Lilly Truscott on the Disney Channel television series Hannah Montana (2006–2011) and its film spinoff Hannah Montana: The Movie (2009).

Osment appeared as Cassie Keller in the film The Haunting Hour: Don't Think About It (2007) and as Melissa Morris in the Disney Channel television film Dadnapped (2009). She starred as Taylor Hillridge in the television film Cyberbully (2011), Roxie on the streaming series Cleaners (2013–2014), and Roxy Doyle on the Fox television series Almost Family (2019–2020). She also starred as Gabi Diamond on the Freeform television series Young & Hungry (2014–2018), for which she received three Teen Choice Award nominations. From 2018 to 2021, Osment had a recurring role as Theresa on the Netflix comedy-drama series The Kominsky Method, for which she received two nominations for a Screen Actors Guild Award for Outstanding Performance by an Ensemble in a Comedy Series. She has a recurring role as Mandy on the CBS sitcom Young Sheldon since 2022. 

Osment came to prominence in music after recording songs for the soundtracks of her Disney projects, most notably a duet of "If I Didn't Have You" with Mitchel Musso in 2007 and a cover of "Once Upon a Dream" in 2008. In 2009, she signed a recording contract with Wind-Up Records, with whom she released one extended play, All the Right Wrongs (2009), and one studio album, Fight or Flight (2010). She currently performs under the alias Bluebiird, and has released one extended play, When I Loved You (2019).

Early life 
Emily Jordan Osment was born on March 10, 1992 in Los Angeles to actor Michael Eugene Osment and Theresa Osment (née Seifert), an English teacher. She was raised as a Roman Catholic. Her father has appeared in various films, including her film Soccer Mom, and her older brother is Academy Award-nominated actor Haley Joel Osment.

Career

1997–2005: Career beginnings 
Osment's entry into the entertainment industry began in 1997, when she was cast in a commercial for flower delivery company FTD. She was featured in many commercials, after which she made her acting debut in the 1999 film The Secret Life of Girls, starring Eugene Levy and Linda Hamilton. The same year, she co-starred with Glenn Close in the Hallmark Classic television film Sarah, Plain and Tall: Winter's End, a role that would lead to a Young Artist Award nomination. Emily also made a brief appearance in the Smash Mouth music video All Star as the girl in the referee uniform. Since then, she has gone on to do a number of roles, such as appearances on television shows like Touched by an Angel, Friends, and 3rd Rock from the Sun.
In another small screen role, she played Tara Sparkler in the series Goosebumps.
Osment made her film debut in 2002 as Gerti Giggles in Spy Kids 2: The Island of Lost Dreams, a role for which she won the Young Artist Award for Best Performance in a Feature Film. In 2003, she reprised her role in the third film of the Spy Kids series, Spy Kids 3-D: Game Over, which grossed $197 million worldwide. Osment also voiced roles in Lilo & Stitch 2: Stitch Has a Glitch and Edward Fubbwupper Fibbed Big.

2005–2009: Hannah Montana 

In 2005, Osment got the role of Lilly Truscott in the Disney Channel series Hannah Montana, the best friend of Miley Stewart and girlfriend to Oliver Oken on seasons 3 and 4. When Miley was Hannah, Lilly was under the alias Lola Luftnagle. The series premiere scored record ratings for the Disney Channel with 5.4 million viewers, a response "beyond our wildest expectations", according to the president of Disney Channel Entertainment. The show earned her a nomination for Young Artist Award in 2007 for Best Performance in a TV Series (Comedy or Drama). In addition, Osment helped to design some of the pieces from the collection of clothing Hannah Montana Disney, which released the last part in the summer of 2006. She also had a voice over role in a movie called Holidaze: The Christmas That Almost Didn't Happen. She performed several songs for the movie, including "Don't Ya Just Love Christmas" and "One Day". Emily sings the chorus of the Billy Ray Cyrus song "You've Got a Friend", from his album 2007 Home at Last. Osment has also recorded a song titled "I Don't Think About It" in The Haunting Hour: Don't Think About It, for which they made a music video. The video was released in Haunting Hour DVD and premiered at Cartoon Network.

On December 25, Osment hosted the Walt Disney World Christmas Day Parade with Hannah Montana co-star Mitchel Musso. The parade featured Miley Cyrus and the High School Musical cast. She and Musso performed a sketch based on a Hannah Montana episode. Osment also had a voice-over role in a movie called Holidaze: The Christmas That Almost Didn't Happen, which also featured the voices of fellow Disney Channel stars Brenda Song and Dylan and Cole Sprouse. Osment performed several songs for the film, including "Don't Ya Just Love Christmas" and "One Day". She also starred as a goth in R. L. Stine's The Haunting Hour: Don't Think About It. It earned her a Young Artist Award nomination in 2008 for "Best Performance in a TV Movie, Miniseries or Special Leading Young Actress". She recorded the song "I Don't Think About It" for the movie's soundtrack.

Osment recorded a remake version of the song "If I Didn't Have You" with Mitchel Musso for the DisneyMania 6 CD. The song was produced by Bryan Todd. The two also filmed a music video for their remake. She recorded a song, released in 2008, with The Disney Channel Circle of Stars. She recorded a remake of "Once Upon A Dream", released on September 12, 2008. She recorded a song called "Hero in Me" for the Disney Channel original movie, Dadnapped and also filmed a music video to accompany it. In 2008 she starred in the film Soccer Mom, and was ranked on No. 1 on Parade magazine and Forbes to Hot Kid Stars To Watch list. She also starred in the Disney Channel original movie, Dadnapped which premiered in February 2009.

2009–2012: All the Right Wrongs and Fight or Flight 
In June 2009, Osment signed with Wind-Up Records and announced that she was writing and recording tracks with Eve 6. She has collaborated on tunes with Tom Higgenson, Max Collins, Tony Fagenson, Toby Gad and Mandi Perkins. "All the Way Up" was released as the lead single on August 25, 2009. The song debuted at No. 77 in the Canadian Hot 100 then a week later peaked at No. 76. On October 26, 2009, Osment release her debut extended play, All The Right Wrongs, with six songs in the standard edition and eight songs in the deluxe. The EP peaked at No. 117 at Billboard Top 200 and No. 1 at Top Heatseekers About the album, Osment said: "The songs on the album are from four different people, I wrote with four different people, and they all had to fit on the album together…I kind of just did my own thing. I listen to a lot of Alanis Morissette, I kind of got inspired from her and her song "Jagged Little Pill" ...There's a lot of edge to (Emily's album)...I love hearing the guitars and the drums in the songs". "You Are the Only One" was released as second single on February 27, 2010. It failed to make an impact on any charts, but enjoyed some success on Radio Disney. Originally, "You Are the Only One" was intended to be released as the lead single from the album, but was dropped due to Osment wanting to release "All the Way Up" instead.

Osment confirmed through her Twitter account that she would be on tour: the Clap Your Hands Tour included nine dates in the United States. On March 24, 2010, Osment confirmed on Good Day New York that her debut album would be released in the summer of 2010. "Let's Be Friends" was released as the album's lead single on June 8, 2010. The single debuted and peaked at No. 24 on the Billboard Japan Hot 100 chart and No. 67 at Germany. In addition, the single became her first to chart on an official US singles chart, when it peaked at No. 31 on the Billboard Hot Dance Club Play chart. In October 5 she released her first album, Fight or Flight, focused on electropop and synthpop. The album peaked at No. 170 at Billboard Top 200 and No. 2 at Top Heatseekers The second single, "Lovesick", was released on February 4, 2011. Due to the strong digital downloads the song received, the song debuted at No. 165 on the UK Singles Chart. During the week of April 17, 2011, the single entered the Top 100 in the UK, reaching a peak of 67 on the chart. The single also became her second to achieve success on the Canadian Hot 100, where it debuted at No. 71, and later rose to a peak of 66.

In October, Osment made her second tour Fight or Flight Tour to promote her first album Fight or Flight. It included concerts in North America, Europe and Latin America . It began on October 30, 2010, in São Paulo, Brazil, and ended on December 8, 2010, in Appleton, Wisconsin. Osment presented at the 2010 MTV Europe Music Awards on November 7 in Madrid, Spain, presenting an award to Justin Bieber for best male artist. In March 2010, Osment lent her voice to the secondary character, Kendall Perkins for the animated series Kick Buttowski: Suburban Daredevil on Disney XD. On May 10, 2011, she released the duet single "Hush" with Josh Ramsay of Marianas Trench, and the song peaked at No. 90 in Canada.  In 2011, Osment starred in the ABC Family movie about a young woman who suffers cyberbullying, called Cyberbully, released on July 17, 2011. ABC worked with Seventeen to make the film with the hope that it would help eliminate Internet harassment. It was filmed in Montreal and was released on DVD on February 7, 2012. The film received generally positive reviews and had 3.4 million viewers on its premiere. To promote the film, she released her single, "Drift".

2013–present: Cleaners, Young & Hungry, and return to music as Bluebiird 
In 2013, Osment starred in the TV series Cleaners, which in 2014 was announced for a second season. Osment had a cameo in Life with Boys, and appeared in four episodes of Family Guy. She reprised her voice role as Pep for the third Beverly Hills Chihuahua film, which was released on DVD September 18, 2012, and was one of her last works at Disney. Emily Osment confirmed through her official Facebook account that she had left her label Wind-Up Records and has launched an independent project with airs folk, indie and country in a band called Ramshackle, consisting of Osment and her friend Dan Schechter, performing in bars such as the Troubadour and at the Spiedie Fest 2013, performing covers of The Beatles, R. Kelly and "Lullaby". In 2013, Osment made a special participation in the episode "Bazinga! That's From a TV Show" for the comedy series Two And A Half Men where she played the role of Ashley. Osment starred in the short film called Seasick Sailor led by Devon Bostick and Torre Catalano. The film has been presented in some film festivals and won the award for Best Narrative Short at the Los Angeles Film Festival.

Osment also participated in the drama, Kiss Me, directed by Jeff Probst in which she starred opposite Irish actress Sarah Bolger. In October, Osment filmed a new movie No Way Jose. In October 2013, the third movie in the Nightmare franchise started filming, called A Daughter's Nightmare, which premiered on Lifetime in 2014. Osment recorded the song In Case Of Fire for the soundtrack of the film. Osment also finished recording the second season of the web series Cleaners.

In 2014, she debuted as the lead role in the new ABC Family TV series Young & Hungry, produced by Ashley Tisdale. Osment plays Gabi, a feisty young blogger hired as the personal chef to a young San Francisco tech entrepreneur. The pilot episode, which aired on June 25, 2014, garnered 1.08 million views in the U.S.

In 2015, one of the projects Osment is involved in is the movie Love Is All You Need? The film, which also stars Briana Evigan, is an independent drama set in a world where being gay is normal and heterosexual people are intimidated. In August 2015, Osment was booked for a recurring role on the third season of the CBS series Mom. She played Jodi, a girl living on the street who was a drug addict; Christy (Anna Faris) and Bonnie (Allison Janney) helped her stay clean and find a job. The third season premiered on November 5, 2015. But Jodi died from a drug overdose in midseason, a decision made with the creation of the character.

Emily Osment confirmed through her official Facebook page, that on March 8, 2019, International Women's Day, she released her first single as a new musical alias Bluebiird, "Black Coffee Morning", followed by "Sailor" on April 26 and "Good Girl" on June 21, respectively. She released an EP under the alias titled When I Loved You on September 27.

Also in 2018, she was cast in a recurring role as Theresa, an acting student in The Kominsky Method. The series ran for three seasons, and Osment received two nominations for a Screen Actors Guild Award for Outstanding Performance by an Ensemble in a Comedy Series. The third and final season premiered on May 28, 2021.
On October 8, 2021, Osment's new sitcom, Pretty Smart premiered on Netflix.

In 2022, she joined the cast of Young Sheldon as Mandy, the weather girl who becomes Georgie’s love interest and eventually pregnant with his child. She has been promoted to series regular starting with the sixth season.

Other ventures

Image and products 

In 2007, Osment signed a deal to appear in a nationwide campaign called "Smart Girls Rock" by the New York-based denim brand Vanilla Star. "It's a new line for girls, the clothes are really denim and girly with an edge of punk." She promoted her song "I Don't Think About It" with the release of the campaign and commercial. Late that summer, Disney released a Hannah Montana clothing collection. Osment helped to design some of the pieces from the collection. Her image was used in some of these pieces, as well as other Hannah Montana merchandise (such as dolls and DVDs).

Philanthropy 
Osment signed with CosmoGIRL! shirts for the president of an online charity auction. In 2007, Osment designed a line of shirts for 2lovecollection.com, whose proceeds went to the Make-A-Wish Foundation and St. Jude Children's Research Hospital.

In early 2008, Osment participated in the "Disney Channel Earth Day", where she and other Disney stars met with TreePeople to teach children how to care for the environment with small changes in their homes and neighborhoods. Osment was also part of the green project, Disney's Friends for Change, an initiative for the environment created in 2009. The campaign wants young people aware of the current environmental situation and engage with it in around them. Children had the opportunity to choose how Disney will invest one million dollars in various environmental programs.

Osment is a Global Ambassador for STOMP Out Bullying, the leading national Anti-Bullying/Cyberbullying organization in the country for kids and teens. She for was voted the U.G.L.Y celebrity of 2011 at the seventh annual Celebrity of the Year Award, thanks to the votes of young Americans impressed with the performance of the actress in her TV movie Cyberbully.

Filmography

Film

Television

Video games

Discography 

Studio albums
 Fight or Flight (2010)

Extended plays
 All the Right Wrongs (2009)
When I Loved You (as Bluebiird) (2019)

Tours 
Headlining
 Clap Your Hands Tour (2010)
 Fight or Flight Tour (2010)

Awards and nominations

References

External links 

 
 
 

1992 births
Living people
Child pop musicians
American child singers
Geffen Records artists
Wind-up Records artists
American film actresses
American child actresses
Singers from Los Angeles
Catholics from California
Occidental College alumni
Actresses from Los Angeles
American women pop singers
Walt Disney Records artists
American television actresses
21st-century American singers
20th-century American actresses
21st-century American actresses
American women singer-songwriters
American women in electronic music
21st-century American women singers
Singer-songwriters from California